Luca Baldisserri (born 11 December 1962) is an Italian engineer, best known for being the Chief Track Engineer for Scuderia Ferrari between 2007 and 2015.

Career

Scuderia Ferrari
He joined Scuderia Ferrari in 1989, and in 1995 he became Gerhard Berger's race engineer. He worked with Eddie Irvine, and later Michael Schumacher. He was Schumacher's race engineer when he won his first World Drivers Championship in 2000. They continued this partnership to the 2001 and 2002 championships.

Between 2003 and 2006, Baldisserri sat alongside Ross Brawn on the Ferrari pitwall leading the teams race strategy. At the end of 2006, Brawn took a sabbatical from Ferrari and Baldisserri took over as Chief Track Engineer. When Brawn joined Honda, Baldisserri's role was made permanent.  At the 2009 Chinese Grand Prix, Baldisserri was relieved of duty and moved into a factory role before becoming the Ferrari Driver Academy Manager a role he held until 2015.

Lance Stroll
In December 2015, Baldisserri left Scuderia Ferrari and worked exclusively with Canadian driver Lance Stroll. Stroll at the time had moved to the Williams F1 Team young driver development programme from Ferrari's. Baldisserri worked with Stroll on his 2016 Formula 3 championship victory.

In late 2017, he was Lance's race engineer at Williams and for the 2018 season he held the role alongside James Unwin.

After F1
Following his stint with Stroll at Williams, Baldisseri joined Global Racing Service in 2020.

References

 

1962 births
Living people
Engineers from Bologna
Italian automotive engineers
Formula One engineers
Ferrari people
Italian motorsport people